The 1954 Minnesota gubernatorial election took place on November 2, 1954. Minnesota Democratic–Farmer–Labor Party candidate Orville Freeman defeated Republican Party of Minnesota incumbent C. Elmer Anderson.

Results

See also
 List of Minnesota gubernatorial elections

External links
 http://www.sos.state.mn.us/home/index.asp?page=653
 http://www.sos.state.mn.us/home/index.asp?page=657

Minnesota
Gubernatorial
1954
November 1954 events in the United States